Rajshahi Polytechnic Institute is a government technical institute located in Rajshahi, Bangladesh. It was established in 1963. It offers four year Diploma-in-Engineering courses under the Bangladesh Technical Education Board.

History 
Rajshahi Polytechnic Institute was established in 1963 at Sapora of Rajshahi. The institute has seven academic buildings.

Academic programs
It offers four-year diplomas in the following areas: 
 Civic technology
 Electrical technology
 Mechanical technology
 Computer technology
 Electronics technology
 Power technology
 Electromedical technology
 Mechatronics technology

Gallery

References

External links 
Official site

Educational institutions established in 1963
Polytechnic institutes in Bangladesh
1963 establishments in East Pakistan